Polyferrocenes are polymers containing ferrocene units. Ferrocene offers many advantages over pure hydrocarbons when used as a building block of macromolecular chemistry. The variety of possible substitutions at the ferrocene parent body results in a multitude of accessible polymers with interesting electronic and photonic properties. Many polyferrocenes are relatively easily accessible. Poly(1,1'-ferrocene-silane) can be prepared by ring-opening polymerization and has a variety of interesting properties, such as a high refractive index or semiconductor properties. Ring-opening polymerization usually leads to polymers containing ferrocene in the backbone. Besides the latter motif, ferrocene can be attached to the backbone as pendant unit as well.

Potential applications 
Polyferrocenes currently have no commercial applications, despite being the subject of research for nearly 50 years.  Polyvinylferrocene gives electroactive films that have been investigated as glucose sensors.

Coatings 
Satellites charge themselves by the bombardment with charged particles of the solar wind. Charging can lead to an arc discharge which can impair the function of the satellite due to magnetic disturbances and material failure. To avoid these impairments, coatings of electrically weak or non-conductive plastic components of thin films of poly(1,1'-ferrocen-silane) were examined. These carry off the charge generated by the irradiation and thus could protect the satellite from overloads.

Polymers with high refractive index 
Polyferroccenes have attracted interest as high-refractive-index polymers, such as in antireflection coatings or for light-emitting diodes. Poly(1,1'-ferrocene-silane)e, poly(1,1'-ferrocene-phosphane) and polyferrocenes with phenyl side chains are polymers with unusually high refractive index, with values in the refractive index of up to 1.74. These polyferrocenes show good film-forming ability.

Plasma-assisted reactive ion etching  
Poly(ferrocene-dimethylsilane)s (PFS) are promising as barrier materials in plasma-assisted reactive ion etching. Due to the presence of iron and silicon in the main chain, the polymer proved to be relatively stable compared to purely organic polymers. During the etching, a thin iron and silicon-containing oxide layer was formed on the surface of the poly(ferrocene-dimethylsilane).

Further reading 
 
 Jürgen Falbe, Manfred Regitz (Hrsg.): Römpp-Lexikon Chemie, 9th edition, Bd.5, PI-S, 1999, p. 3449-3455.

References

External links

Ferrocenes
Iron compounds
Polymers